Elachista cicadella is a moth of the family Elachistidae. It is found in Canada, where it has been recorded from Yukon.

References

cicadella
Moths described in 1999
Moths of North America
Endemic fauna of Canada
Endemic fauna of Yukon